This is a list of airlines currently operating in Namibia.

Active

Defunct

See also
 List of airlines

References

Namibia
Airlines
Airlines
Namibia